The Eugene O'Neill Theater Center in Waterford, Connecticut, is a 501(c)(3) non-profit theater company founded in 1964 by George C. White.  It is commonly referred to as The O'Neill. The center has received two Tony Awards, the 1979 Special Award and the 2010 Regional Theatre Award. President Obama presented the 2015 National Medal of Arts to The O'Neill on September 22, 2016.

The O'Neill is a multi-disciplinary institution; it has had a transformative effect on American theater. The O'Neill pioneered play development and stage readings as a tool for new plays and musicals. It is home to the National Theater Institute (established 1970), an intensive study-away semester for undergraduates. Its major theater conferences include the National Playwrights Conference (est. 1965); the National Critics Conference (est. 1968), the National Musical Theater Conference (est. 1978), the National Puppetry Conference (est. 1990), and the Cabaret & Performance Conference (est. 2005). The Monte Cristo Cottage, Eugene O'Neill's childhood home in New London, Connecticut, was purchased and restored by the O'Neill in the 1970s and is maintained as a museum. The theater's campus, overlooking Long Island Sound in Waterford Beach Park, has four major performance spaces: two indoor and two outdoor. The O'Neill is led by Executive Director Tifanni Gavin.

The estate, also known as Walnut Grove or Hammond Estate, was added to the National Register of Historic Places on September 21, 2005, for its architectural significance, and its associations with Revolutionary War Colonel William North and Edward Crowninshield Hammond, a wealthy railroad tycoon who frequently had the young O'Neill thrown off of the property when he owned it.

Major works  
The following is a list of plays, musicals, and performance pieces first developed at the O'Neill that have gone on to further success.

 National Playwrights Conference
 Slave Play - Jeremy O. Harris (2018)
 I'm Gonna Pray For You So Hard – Halley Feiffer (2014)
 The Nether – Jennifer Haley (2011), Susan Smith Blackburn Prize, 2012
 The Receptionist – Adam Bock (2006)
 Fuddy Meers – David Lindsay-Abaire (1998)
 Trueblinka – Adam Rapp (1997)
 Seven Guitars – August Wilson (1994)
 The Piano Lesson – August Wilson (1986)
 Joe Turner's Come and Gone – August Wilson (1984)
 Fences – August Wilson (1983)
 Danny and the Deep Blue Sea – John Patrick Shanley (1982)
 Ma Rainey's Black Bottom – August Wilson (1982)
 Agnes of God – John Pielmeier (1979)
 FOB – David Henry Hwang (1979)
 Bent – Martin Sherman (1978)
 Uncommon Women and Others – Wendy Wasserstein (1977)
 A History of the American Film – Christopher Durang (1976)
 Madmen and Specialists – Wole Soyinka (1970)
 House of Blue Leaves – John Guare (1966)

 National Musical Theater Conference
 Tales of the City (2009)
 In the Heights (2005), Tony Award, (2008)
 Avenue Q (2002), Tony Award, (2004)
 The Wild Party (1997)
 Nine (1979), Tony Award, Best Musical, 1982

 Cabaret & Performance Conference
 The Story of My Life (2006)
 title of show (2005)

 National Critics Conference
 Chelsea on the Edge: The Adventures of an American Theater – Davi Napoleon

Notable O'Neill alumni 
 National Theater Institute
 Emily Bergl
 Adam Bock (The Receptionist)
 Gordon Clapp (NYPD Blue)
 Jack Coleman (Heroes)
 Michael Douglas
 Rachel Dratch (Saturday Night Live)
 Chris Elliott (Saturday Night Live)
 Michael Emerson
 Jennifer Garner
 Paul Hodes (US Congressman, New Hampshire)
 Kristina Klebe
 John Krasinski (The Office)
 Jeremy Piven (Entourage)
 Michael Portnoy
 Josh Radnor (How I Met Your Mother)
 Kate Robin (Six Feet Under)
 Sam Robards
 Britain Simons
 Mark Teschner
 Rebecca Taichman
 Elizabeth Olsen
 Adam Shulman
 Cynthia Wade

 Conference Playwrights
 Roberto Aguirre-Sacasa
 Edward Albee
 Lee Blessing
 Julia Cho
 Kathleen Clark
 Kia Corthron
 Joe DiPietro
 Christopher Durang
 Jacob Aaron Estes
 Rebecca Gilman
 Gina Gionfriddo
 John Guare
 Willy Holtzman
 Israel Horovitz
 Samuel D. Hunter
 David Henry Hwang
 David Lindsay-Abaire
 Adam Rapp
 John Patrick Shanley
 Sam Shepard
 Regina Taylor
 Wendy Wasserstein
 August Wilson
 Lanford Wilson

See also
National Register of Historic Places listings in New London County, Connecticut

References

External links

Performing groups established in 1964
Theatre companies in Connecticut
Drama schools in the United States
Theatres in Connecticut
Tony Award winners
Buildings and structures in Waterford, Connecticut
Tourist attractions in New London County, Connecticut
Buildings and structures in New London County, Connecticut
National Register of Historic Places in New London County, Connecticut
Federal architecture in Connecticut
Gothic Revival architecture in Connecticut
1820s architecture in the United States
Historic districts in New London County, Connecticut
1964 establishments in Connecticut
Historic districts on the National Register of Historic Places in Connecticut
Special Tony Award recipients